"Stupid" (stylized in all caps) is a song by American rapper Ashnikko featuring American rapper Yung Baby Tate from the former's third EP, Hi It's Me, released under Digital Picnic/Parlophone Records on July 12, 2019. Produced by Oscar Scheller, "Stupid" became popular on the video-sharing app TikTok, where celebrities like Miley Cyrus and Cody Simpson have danced to the song. It has been described as industrial and pop-rap. The song received positive reviews from music critics, who praised the song for its production, songwriting and vocal performances.

Reception 
Since September 2019, the song has been used in over 400,000 videos on TikTok, and has gained over 80 million streams on Spotify alone. Miley Cyrus gained over 2.3 million likes when she lip-synced the song on a TikTok video with Cody Simpson. The song topped the Billboard Bubbling Under Hot 100 chart, the Billboard Bubbling Under R&B/Hip-Hop chart, and the Spotify Viral 50 chart.

Cat Zhang from Pitchfork described the song as a "venemous  rap song animated by its snide dismissal of men, ghoulish theatrics, and Pornhub shoutouts." Robin Murray from Clash said "[the song is] a sign of her personal and creative autonomy, with Ashnikko placing herself front and centre in a striking but de-sexualised way."

Ashnikko responded to the song's performance online when she took to Instagram to write, "Since 'Stupid' is having a weird little moment on tik tok I think that it's only fair that I force u all to help me actualise my lifelong dream of going viral". When asked in an interview with Billboard about how the song got the reaction that it did, Ashnikko said "It's quite a divisive song, isn't it? The lyrics are straight-to-the-point and blunt and honest."

Credits and personnel 
Credits adapted from Tidal:

 Oscar Scheller – producer, mixer, programmer, recorded by, writer
Ashnikko – vocals, writer
 Yung Baby Tate – vocals, writer
 Zach Nicholis – engineer

Charts

Certifications

References

2019 songs
2019 singles
Ashnikko songs
Baby Tate (rapper) songs
Parlophone singles
Songs written by Ashnikko
Songs written by Baby Tate (rapper)
Pop-rap songs
Industrial songs